Lovin' Life is an album from Contemporary Christian, Southern Gospel group Gaither Vocal Band. The album was released on April 15, 2008.

Track listing
 "I'm Forgiven" (Hibbard, Hockensmith, Omartian) - 4:00
 "Build an Ark" (Evans) - 3:32
 "Jesus and John Wayne" (Gaither, Gaither, Gaither, Johnson, Williams) - 3:03
 "Go Ask" (Gaither, Gaither) - 4:23
 "Home of Your Dreams" (Gaither, Gaither, Gaither) - 5:04
 "Search Me Lord" (Dorsey) - 2:28
 "Lonely Mile" (Slaughter) - 2:46
 "There's Always a Place at the Table" (Gaither, Gaither, Gatlin) - 5:13
 "The Diff'rence Is in Me" (Gaither, Gaither) - 3:01
 "I'm Loving Life" (Gaither, Silvey, Williams) - 2:40
 "When I Cry" (Gaither, Hall) - 4:29
 "Prisoner of Hope" (Gaither, Silvey, Williams) - 3:15
 "Then He Bowed His Head and Died" (Gaither, Gaither) - 5:22

Awards

At the 40th GMA Dove Awards, Lovin' Life won a Dove Award for Southern Gospel Album of the Year. Also, the song "Jesus & John Wayne" was nominated for Country Recorded Song of the Year. The album also won a Grammy Award for Best Southern, Country, or Bluegrass Gospel Album at the 51st Grammy Awards.

Chart performance

The album peaked at #123 on the Billboard 200 and #6 on Billboard's Christian Albums.

References

2008 albums
Gaither Vocal Band albums